The 71-619 (colloquially KTM-19) is the modern Russian four-axle high-floor motor tramcar. These rail vehicles are produced at the Ust'-Katav Wagon-building plant ( - Russian abbreviation and full name). "KTM" means Kirov Motor Tramcar. This abbreviation was the producer's official trademark before 1976, when a new designation system for tram and subway rolling stock was introduced in the Soviet Union. The abandoned the KTM trademark still lives in everyday conversations of Russian tram workers and enthusiasts.

See also 
 Tram

References

External links 
 71-619 on Nizhny Novgorod TramSite (in Russian)

tram vehicles of Russia